Monsignor Bonner High School was an all-male Augustinian Catholic High School in the Roman Catholic Archdiocese of Philadelphia. It was located in Drexel Hill, Pennsylvania. Bonner was created in 1953 as Archbishop Prendergast High School for Boys. In 1955, the current building was constructed, and in 1957 entitled Monsignor Bonner High School. The previously occupied building became the all-female Archbishop Prendergast High School. In 2012, Bonner merged with the all-girls Archbishop Prendergast High School to form Monsignor Bonner and Archbishop Prendergast High School. The Order of St. Augustine is no longer associated with the combined institution.

History
Monsignor Bonner was run by the Order of Saint Augustine of the Province of St. Thomas of Villanova. It was one of nine Augustinian high schools in North America. Bonner had a storied history with the Augustinians, as those assigned to Bonner resided in the friary behind the school. Monsignor John J. Bonner, the school's namesake, was the Superintendent of Schools of the Archdiocese of Philadelphia from 1926 to 1945. He is credited with establishing the Philadelphia Catholic League and was one of the best-known Catholic educators in the country.

In September 2005, the Office of Catholic Education of the Archdiocese of Philadelphia announced an administrative restructuring of Monsignor Bonner High School for Boys and the neighboring Archbishop Prendergast High School for Girls. The schools began operating under one administration beginning on 1 July 2006. Bonner's president was appointed president of the new co-institutional Monsignor Bonner & Archbishop Prendergast Catholic High School. The principal of neighboring Archbishop Prendergast High School, Mrs. Mary Berner, was named principal of the co-institutional school in January 2006.

The Augustinians in North America
The order's North American foundation happened in 1796 when Irish friars arrived in Philadelphia. Michael Hurley was the first American to join the Order the following year. Friars established schools, universities, and other works throughout the Americas, also including Villanova University in Philadelphia (USA) and Merrimack College (USA). Malvern Preparatory School was founded in 1842 alongside Villanova University. By 1909, two Augustinian houses and a school had been established in Chicago, 1922 in San Diego, by 1925 a school in Ojai and Los Angeles; 1926 a school in Oklahoma; in 1947 a college in Massachusetts; in 1952 Austin Catholic Preparatory School in Detroit, Michigan (closed in 1978); in 1953 this school; 1959 a school in New Jersey, another in Reading (Massachusetts); and in 1962 a school in Illinois.

The Augustinian Friars left campus and removed themselves from the day-to-day activities of the school at the end of the 2008-2009 academic school year. Due to the lack of priests in the Augustinian Order and the expense to the Province of Saint Thomas of Villanova, they decided to leave and focus on the remaining parishes, ministries, facilities, and educational institutions they serve. Many of Bonner's friars relocated to nearby Malvern Preparatory School.

Admissions
At one time, the student body numbered 3,000. In 2012, it was 600.

Notable alumni
Dennis Christopher - Golden Globe nominated film and stage actor
John Cappelletti - 1973 Heisman Trophy winner and College Football Hall of Fame inductee
Jamie Kennedy - stand-up comedian, television producer, screenwriter, and actor
Quang Vinh - Vietnamese singer
Anthony Becht - Former NFL tight end with the New York Jets, Tampa Bay Buccaneers, St. Louis Rams, Arizona Cardinals, and Kansas City Chiefs (2000-2011)
Al Atkinson - Former NFL & AFL linebacker for the New York Jets (1965-1974). 1967 AFL All-Star and Super Bowl II champion.
Larry Mendte - news anchor, commentator and radio talk show host. First male host of Access Hollywood.
Carlos Mugabo - former basketball player for Florida Atlantic University (2005-2009) and the Rwanda national basketball team
Jason Love - professional basketball player for Unión de Santa Fe of the TNA
Marcus McElhenney - won bronze medal for rowing in the men's eight at the 2008 Summer Olympics
Harry Perretta - Villanova University women's basketball head coach (1978–2020). 1996 Big East Conference women's basketball Coach of the Year.
John Nash - former NBA general manager of the Philadelphia 76ers (1986–1990), Washington Bullets (1990–1996), New Jersey Nets (1999–2000), and Portland Trail Blazers (2003–2006)
Rodney Blake - former professional basketball player. Inducted into the Philadelphia Big 5 Hall of Fame.
Ed Stefanski - former professional basketball player and NBA general manager of the New Jersey Nets (2004-2007) and Philadelphia 76ers (2007-2010)
Jerry Crawford - former umpire in Major League Baseball (1977-2010) and president of the Major League Umpires Association
Marc Verica - former professional football quarterback for the Washington Redskins (2011) and Cougars de Saint-Ouen l'Aumône, France (2012-2013)
Leo Burt - indicted in connection with the August 24, 1970, Sterling Hall bombing at the University of Wisconsin–Madison campus. Member of FBI Ten Most Wanted Fugitives list from September 4, 1970, to April 7, 1976.
Mike Teti - head coach of United States National Men's Rowing Team (2018–present). Won bronze medal for rowing in the men's eight at the 1988 Summer Olympics.
Ashley Howard - La Salle University men's basketball head coach (2018–present)
Christopher G. Donovan - former Democratic politician who served as the Speaker of the Connecticut House of Representatives (2009-2013)
Sam Oropeza - professional mixed martial artist and boxer. Has competed for Bellator MMA, Strikeforce, and King of the Cage
Thomas J. Stapleton - Pennsylvania State Representative for the 165th district (1975-1978)
 Carl Robie - Gold medal swimmer in 200 m butterfly “the Philadelphia flyer” (1959-1961) 
 David Krmpotich - Olympic silver medalist, rowing, men's coxless fours, and U.S. team torch bearer at 1988 Seoul Olympics.

Notable staff

Presidents
The position of President established in 1993 for all Archdiocesan High Schools. The President is responsible for financial operations, facilities issues, fundraising, alumni relations, and external affairs.
1993 to 1996: Rev. Gordon Marcellus, O.S.A.
1996 to 1999: Mr. Thomas Smith
1999 to 2001: Rev. John Denny, O.S.A. '75
2001 to 2009: Rev. Augustine M. Esposito, O.S.A '69
2009 to 2012: Rev. James P. Olson

Principals
The Principal was originally the top administrator in the school. In 1993, this shifted when the Presidency was introduced. Since then, the Principal has handled the day-to-day operation of the school.
1953 to 1959: Rev. John Gallagher, O.S.A.
1959 to 1962: Rev. Kenneth Kennedy, O.S.A.
1962 to 1967: Rev. Thomas Mahoney, O.S.A.
1967 to 1972: Rev. David Duffy, O.S.A.
1972 to 1974: Rev. Francis Sevick, O.S.A.
1974 to 1976: Rev. Harry Erdlen, O.S.A.
1976 to 1979: Rev. George Burnell, O.S.A.
1979 to 1987: Rev. Francis Horn, O.S.A., '67
1987 to 1993: Rev. Gordon Marcellus, O.S.A.
1993 to 1999: Rev. John T. Denny, O.S.A., '75
1999 to 2005: Dr. Thomas F. Rooney, EdD, '62
2005 to 2006: Mr. William Brannick, '95 (Acting Principal)
2006 to 2007: Mrs. Mary Haley Berner, (first co-institutional Principal)
2007 to 2012: Mr. William E. Brannick, '95 (co-institutional Principal)

Notes

External links
Order of St Augustine, International Homepage
Augnet International Cooperative Web Site for Schools in the Tradition of St. Augustine
Augustinian Abbey of St. Thomas at Brno
The International Alliance of Catholic Knights

Boys' schools in the United States
Augustinian schools
Catholic secondary schools in Pennsylvania
Roman Catholic Archdiocese of Philadelphia
Educational institutions established in 1953
Schools in Delaware County, Pennsylvania
Rugby league stadiums in the United States
1953 establishments in Pennsylvania
Rugby league in Pennsylvania
2012 disestablishments in Pennsylvania
Educational institutions disestablished in 2012